Ngemba may refer to:

Ngemba Evans Obi, Nigerian football player
Ngemba languages of Cameroon
Ngiyampaa people, an aggregated group of Aboriginal Australian people of New South Wales